From their first match in 1922 to their final match in 1946, 63 players represented the Royal Air Force cricket team in first-class cricket. A first-class match is a domestic cricket match between two representative teams, each having first-class status, as determined by the governing body for cricket in the country where the match is being played. First-class matches consist of matches of three or more days' duration, between two teams of eleven players, played on turf pitches.

The Royal Air Force was formed during World War I in 1918, with the Royal Air Force cricket team being formed in 1919 and playing its first against the British Army cricket team at Lord's in the same year.

This list includes all players who have played at least one first-class match and is initially arranged in the order of debut appearance. Where more than one player won their first cap in the same match, those players are initially listed by batting order at the time of debut.

Key

List of players

References

Royal Air Force
Royal Air Force
Cricketers